James Blair Bibby (October 29, 1944 – February 16, 2010) was an American Major League Baseball right-handed pitcher. During a 12-year baseball career, he pitched from 1972 to 1984 with the St. Louis Cardinals, Texas Rangers, Cleveland Indians, and Pittsburgh Pirates, with whom he was a member of its 1979 World Series champions. In 1973, Bibby pitched a no-hitter against the Oakland Athletics. Also, in 1981, as a member of the Pirates, he missed out on a perfect game by just one hit, allowing a lead off single, before retiring the next 27 batters he faced.

Playing career

New York Mets organization
Bibby attended Fayetteville State University on a basketball scholarship, and also pitched for its varsity baseball team. His professional career began when he was signed by the New York Mets as an undrafted free agent after his junior year on July 19, 1965. With Fayetteville State having discontinued its baseball program in the late-1970s, he was the only player from the university to reach the major leagues.

After appearing in thirteen games and posting a 2–3 record with an 11.25 ERA with the Marion Mets in 1965, he spent the next two years on active duty with the United States Army as a truck driver in Vietnam. On his return to baseball, Bibby moved up the organization's minor league system, first with the Raleigh-Durham Mets in 1968 before splitting time with the Memphis Blues and Tidewater Tides in 1969. His progress was interrupted again in 1970 when a back injury which required a spinal fusion of the first and second vertebrae sidelined him for the entire season and put his career in doubt. Bibby rebounded in 1971 by having his best campaign in the minors, as he led all Tides pitchers with a 15–6 mark.

St. Louis Cardinals
He made his major-league debut at age 27 as the starter in the second game of a Labor Day doubleheader at Busch Memorial Stadium on September 4. Despite surrendering four runs in  innings, Bibby picked up the win in the 8–7 triumph over the Montreal Expos. He made five more starts to finish the season, but lost three of them.

Texas Rangers
After beginning  at 0–2 with a 9.56 ERA, Bibby was acquired by Texas on June 6, 1973, in exchange for Mike Nagy and John Wockenfuss. The trade was made at the urging of Whitey Herzog who, prior to becoming the Rangers manager, was the Mets director of player development. Herzog explained, "Bibby throws harder than anybody in this league except Nolan Ryan when he's on top of his game."

On July 30, Bibby no-hit the defending and eventual repeat World Champion Oakland Athletics 6–0 at the Oakland–Alameda County Coliseum, the first no-hitter in the franchise's history. Despite issuing six walks and relying almost exclusively on his fastball, he still registered thirteen strikeouts and outdueled Vida Blue—himself a no-hit pitcher in 1970. After he fanned in the ninth inning, Oakland's Reggie Jackson commented on the strike three pitch, "That's the fastest ball I ever saw. Actually I didn't see it. I just heard it." Bibby, whose salary was $15,000 that year, earned a $5,000 raise from team owner Bob Short as a result of the achievement.

On a ballclub that finished with the worst record in the majors at 57–105 and fired Herzog with 24 games remaining in the campaign, Bibby was its winningest pitcher despite a 9–10 record. The nineteen losses, however, are also a club record.

Cleveland Indians
Bibby's inconsistency with his control plagued him again early in  when he went 2–6 with a 5.00 ERA. He was traded along with Jackie Brown, Rick Waits and $100,000 to Cleveland for future Hall-of-Famer Gaylord Perry on June 13, 1975. The deal was actually the result of a feud between Perry and Indians manager Frank Robinson. Bibby compiled a 30–29 record with a 3.36 ERA in his  years in Cleveland. More importantly, with the help of pitching coach Harvey Haddix, he worked on improving his delivery to home plate and also added the curveball, slider and changeup to his repertoire.

During spring training on March 6, 1978, an arbitrator ruled that Bibby be declared a free agent. The reason was indicative of the financially strapped and inept Indians management at the time. Bibby's  contract included a $10,000 bonus if he made at least thirty starts. He started exactly thirty of the 37 contests in which he appeared, but the Indians failed to make the payment by the deadline stated in the terms of the contract.

Pittsburgh Pirates
Bibby signed with Pittsburgh on March 15, 1978. He was originally expected to be the new closer, replacing Goose Gossage, who had left for the New York Yankees in the offseason. Instead, Bibby became a starter in the five-man rotation and had his most productive years with the Pirates, going 50–32 with a 3.53 ERA in five seasons.

His only postseason experience was when he helped the Pirates capture the 1979 World Series Championship. Despite not getting a decision in any of his three starts, Bibby pitched effectively with a 2.08 ERA and 15 strikeouts in  innings. In the 3–2 victory over the Cincinnati Reds in Game 2 of the National League Championship Series at Riverfront Stadium, he pitched seven innings and left the game with a 2–1 lead. Bibby went  innings and departed Game 4 of the Fall Classic with a 6–3 advantage in the 9–6 loss to the Baltimore Orioles at Three Rivers Stadium. When the Pirates clinched the series with a 4–1 win in Game 7 at Memorial Stadium, he lasted four innings, with his only mistake being Rich Dauer's home run to lead off the Orioles' third.

He also made his only appearance in an All-Star Game that season at Dodger Stadium on July 8. Bibby entered the game in relief of Jerry Reuss and pitched a scoreless seventh inning. After Robin Yount flied out to right field, Bibby surrendered a single to center to Willie Randolph, who was retired when Cecil Cooper grounded to the shortstop for a double play.

On May 19, 1981, Bibby began a start against the Atlanta Braves by allowing a leadoff single to right to Terry Harper. From that point on, Bibby hurled the equivalent of a perfect game (but actually a one-hit game) by retiring the next 27 batters in a 5–0 victory. He also excelled at the plate that night by hitting a pair of doubles (to center off Phil Niekro in the fifth, to left off Rick Mahler in the sixth), driving in a run and scoring another.

He was granted free agency on November 7, 1983.

Retirement
Bibby returned to the Rangers on February 7, 1984, but lasted only two months into the regular season as he pitched in eight games out of the bullpen without a decision. His final major league appearance was in a 5–1 loss to the Chicago White Sox at Arlington Stadium on May 26, 1984. After replacing Dave Tobik to start the ninth inning, Bibby allowed a single to Joel Skinner, a double to Rudy Law and an intentional walk to Jerry Hairston, Sr. to load the bases with one out. Bibby managed to not surrender any runs by getting a groundout from Mike Squires and a flyout from Greg Walker. Bibby was released  on June 1.

He was picked up by St. Louis again on June 9. Bibby only appeared in two contests, without a decision, for the Louisville Redbirds, the Cardinals' Triple-A farm team at the time. His career as an active player came to an end when he was released  on July 1.

Coaching career
Bibby earned his bachelor's degree in health and physical education from Lynchburg College in 1980. His first coaching job was with the Durham Bulls immediately after the conclusion of his playing career in 1984. Bibby was the pitching coach for the Carolina League's Lynchburg, Virginia ballclub from 1985 to 1999. He served the franchise beginning when it was affiliated with the Mets and through parent club/name changes in 1988 (Red Sox both) and 1995 (Pirates/Hillcats). Bibby was honored by the Hillcats in 2002, when his uniform number (26) was the first one retired in the city's baseball history. He spent the 2000 minor league season in the same capacity with the Nashville Sounds, but retired from coaching after his contract was not renewed.

Personal
Bibby was an older brother of former NBA players Henry Bibby and uncle of Mike Bibby.

He was married to Jacqueline Ann (Jordan) Bibby and had two daughters, Tamara Bibby of Washington, D.C. and Tanya Bibby (McClain) of Charlotte, North Carolina.

He died in Central Lynchburg General Hospital on February 16, 2010, due to bone cancer.

References

External links

1944 births
2010 deaths
Fayetteville State Broncos baseball players
Fayetteville State Broncos basketball players
Major League Baseball pitchers
Baseball players from North Carolina
African-American baseball players
St. Louis Cardinals players
Texas Rangers players
Cleveland Indians players
Pittsburgh Pirates players
National League All-Stars
Marion Mets players
Raleigh-Durham Mets players
Tidewater Tides players
Louisville Redbirds players
Tulsa Oilers (baseball) players
Deaths from cancer in Virginia
Deaths from bone cancer
People from Franklinton, North Carolina
Winter Haven Super Sox players
American men's basketball players
Florida Instructional League Mets players
20th-century African-American sportspeople
21st-century African-American people